Rhea Pillai is an Indian model known for her works in television and advertising. In 2003, she was honored as the "Woman of the Year", along with Raveena Tandon, Anoushka Shankar and Ritu Beri, on International Women's Day for social service. In 2006, she had a minor screen role in the Hindi movie Corporate. Pillai is involved in the Art of Living Foundation.

Early life
Pillai was born the daughter of Raymond Pillai and his wife Durr-e-shahwar Dhanrajgir. Both of her parents were of mixed communal heritage, and theirs was also a mixed marriage. Her father, Raymond Pillai, was the son of a Malayali Hindu father and an Anglo-Indian mother, and he was raised as a Christian. Pillai's mother, Durr-e-shahwar Dhanrajgir, was the daughter of Maharaja Narsinghraj Dhanrajgir Gyan Bahadur, a Hindu and one of the top noblemen of Hyderabad state, by his consort Zubeida, who hailed from a family of Muslim royals and had acted in the first Indian sound film Alam Ara (1931). She is also the great granddaughter of India's first female film director, Fatima Begum and happens to be the great niece of Sultana, one of the earliest film actresses from India who was the elder sister of her grandmother Zubeida.

Personal life

In 1984, Pillai married a US national named Micheal Vaz. Vaz and Pillai separated in 1988 and got divorced in 1994.

In 1998, Pillai married actor Sanjay Dutt, but they separated after a few years. She stated in 2006 that they remain close friends. After the divorce became official in 2008 and details of the settlement were published by the tabloid MiD DAY, the broadsheet newspaper The Telegraph criticised Pillai for her materialism and her conduct in relation to Dutt.

Pillai had a live-in-relationship with Indian tennis player Leander Paes in the 2000s. The couple has a daughter, Aiyana, born in 2005. She has filed a case against Paes and his father alleging domestic violence in June 2014 at a local metropolitan court. The court found him guilty of various acts of domestic violence in February 2022.

References

External links

 
 

Living people
1965 births
Female models from Hyderabad, India